Witney is a market town on the River Windrush in West Oxfordshire in the county of Oxfordshire, England. The place-name "Witney" is derived from the Old English for "Witta's island". The earliest known record of it is as Wyttannige in a Saxon charter of 969. The Domesday Book of 1086 records it as Witenie.

Notable buildings

The Church of England parish church of St Mary the Virgin was originally Norman. The north porch and north aisle were added in this style late in the 12th century, and survived a major rebuilding in about 1243. In this rebuilding the present chancel, transepts, tower and spire were added and the nave was remodelled, all in the Early English style. In the 14th century a number of side chapels and some of the present windows were added in the Decorated style. In the 15th century the south transept was extended and the present west window of the nave were added in the Perpendicular style.   The tower has a peal of eight bells. The tower of the church is 69 feet (21 metres) high, topped by a tall and slender spire, which brings the total height of the church to 154 feet (47 metres).  

Holy Trinity Church, Wood Green, was built in 1849 in a Gothic Revival rendition of Early English Gothic. St Mary the Virgin and Holy Trinity are now members of a single team parish. 

The Friends Meeting House in Wood Green was built in the 18th century. Since 1997 Quakers in Witney have met at the corn exchange. The Methodist church in the High Street was built in 1850. It is now one of five Methodist churches and chapels in Witney. The Roman Catholic parish of Our Lady and Saint Hugh was founded in 1913. It originally used a chapel in West End built in 1881 but now has its own modern building. The old chapel in West End is now Elim Christian Fellowship. Witney High Street still has several older buildings, which are protected by the Witney and Cogges conservation area.  

Witney Market began in the Middle Ages. Thursday is the traditional market day but there is also a market on Saturday. The buttercross in the market square is so called because people from neighbouring towns would gather there to buy butter and eggs. It was built in about 1600 and its clock was added in 1683.  Witney Town Hall, which is arcaded on the ground floor and has an assembly room on the first floor, was completed in 1786.  Witney has long been an important crossing over the River Windrush. The architect Thomas Wyatt rebuilt the bridge in Bridge Street in 1822.  

Witney Workhouse was on Razor Hill (now Tower Hill). It was designed by the architect George Wilkinson and built in 1835–36. It had four wings radiating from an octagonal central building, similar to Chipping Norton workhouse, which also was built by Wilkinson. His younger brother William Wilkinson added a separate chapel to Witney Workhouse in 1860. In the First World War the workhouse held prisoners of war.  In 1940 the workhouse was converted into Crawford Collets engineering factory under the direction of Leonard Frank Eve. The chapel was made the factory canteen. In 1979 Crawford Collets had the main buildings demolished and replaced with a modern factory, but preserved the entrance gate and former chapel. In 2004 the modern factory was demolished for redevelopment. The gate and chapel have again been preserved and the former chapel converted into offices.

Industry
Witney has been famous for its woollen blankets since the Middle Ages. The water for the production of these blankets is drawn from the River Windrush, which was believed to be the secret of Witney's high-quality blankets. Mops were also traditionally made by the blanket manufacturers; at one time every ship in the Royal Navy had Witney mops aboard. The Blanket Hall in High Street was built in 1721 for weighing and measuring blankets. At one time there were five blanket factories in the town but with the closure of the largest blanket maker Early's, in 2002, the town's blanket industry completely ceased production. Early's factory, once a vital and important part of the town's history, has now been demolished, and is the site of several new housing estates. Early's blanket factory, including shots of working machinery, may be seen in the 1960 Norman Wisdom film There Was a Crooked Man.

One of the oldest mill sites in the town, New Mill, where there has been a mill since the Domesday Book, now houses the head office of Audley Travel. For many years Witney had its own brewery and maltings: J.W. Clinch and Co, which founded the Eagle Maltings in 1841. Courage took over Clinch's and closed it down, but since 1983 Refresh UK's Wychwood Brewery has brewed real ales in the Eagle Maltings. In 2002 Refresh UK contracted to produce ales for W.H. Brakspear, who had sold their former brewery in Henley-upon-Thames for redevelopment. Refresh UK also brews ale for the Prince of Wales' Duchy Originals company.

Railways
The Witney Railway opened Witney's first station in 1861, linking the town to  where the line joined the Oxford, Worcester and Wolverhampton Railway. The Great Western Railway operated services on both lines and eventually took them over. In 1962 British Railways closed the EGR completely and withdrew passenger services from the Witney Railway. In 1970 British Railways closed the Witney Railway completely and it was dismantled.

Reopening proposal
In 2015 Witney Oxford Transport Group (WOT) proposed the reopening of the railway, with a station at Witney, as an alternative to improvements to the A40 road proposed by Oxfordshire County Council. In 2016 WOT and West Oxfordshire Green Party cited chronic traffic congestion on roads linking Witney with Oxford as a reason to reopen the railway. In 2021 WOT Group submitted a bid to the Department for Transport's 'Restoring Your Railway' Ideas Fund for a grant to develop the case for a new railway in the A40 corridor 'Building a better-connected West Oxfordshire, transforming the wider Oxford economic region' as part of an Oxford Metro advocated by Railfuture.

Museums
Witney has four museums. Cogges Manor Farm Museum, in the 13th-century manor house and farm of Cogges, represents farming and countryside history. Witney and District Museum has many artefacts and documents representing the history of the town. Witney Blanket Hall, built in the 18th century, showcases both the history of the Hall and of Witney's blanket industry and has Witney blankets for sale. The Wychwood Brewery has a museum open at weekends.

Education
Witney has three county secondary schools: Henry Box School, Wood Green School and Springfield School. In 1660 Henry Box founded Witney Grammar School. In 1968 it became the comprehensive Henry Box School. In 1970 new school buildings were added to the original 17th-century premises beside Church Green. Wood Green School was founded in 1954 and is at the top of Woodstock Road. Springfield School was founded in 1967 and is a special-needs school for pupils with severe learning difficulties. Springfield School senior section is a self-contained unit, with some shared facilities, within the grounds of Wood Green School. Wood Green was substantially expanded from 2000 to 2004; an additional block with 15 teaching rooms was added, together with a purpose-built sixth form centre, school restaurant and new AstroTurf pitch. 2009 saw part of the old Lower School being remodelled to provide new changing and shower facilities for the AstroTurf pitch and its many users from local community sports clubs.

The King's School is independent of Oxfordshire Local Education Authority. It was founded by Oxfordshire Community Churches, an evangelical Christian organisation, in 1984.  Cokethorpe School is an independent secondary school, founded in 1957.  St. Mary's School beside Church Green was established in 1813. It was a Church of England primary school but in 1953 it became a Church of England controlled School for Infant children, and the Junior children transferred to the Batt School premises. Witney now has two Church of England primary schools: The Batt School in Corn Street and The Blake School in Cogges Hill Road.  Our Lady of Lourdes Catholic Primary School is a Roman Catholic school founded in 1958.

Witney has five community primary schools: Madley Park Community Primary School, Queen's Dyke Primary School, Tower Hill Community Primary School, West Witney Primary School and Witney Community Primary School.
It also has one SEN primary school, Springfield School, which is part of the same school as Springfield secondary School. Springfield school (Primary) shares a building with Madley Brook Primary, but aside from sharing a building, some resources and integration, the schools run independently of one another.  The former Witney Technical College is now part of Abingdon and Witney College. A complete rebuilding of its premises began in September 2008.

Sports
Witney United Football Club, formerly known as Witney Town and nicknamed the Blanketmen, played in the Hellenic League Premier Division, until they dissolved in the 2012–2013 season. Witney and District League is a local association football league with about 32 clubs in five divisions. Witney Rugby Football Club first XV plays in the RFU South West 1 East. Wychwood Ladies Hockey Club's first team play in the Trysport Hockey League Division 1; Witney Hockey Club men's first XI plays in the England Hockey Men's Conference East division and its ladies' first XI plays in South Clubs' Women's Hockey League Division 3A. Witney Swifts Cricket Club first XI plays in Oxfordshire Cricket Association Division Three. Witney Houstons Basketball Club plays in the Oxford and Chiltern League.

The Toleman Group Motorsport racing team was once based in Witney until it was rebranded Benetton Formula in 1986.  The team itself stayed in Witney until 1992 when they moved to Enstone eventually being rebranded in 2002 as Renault F1 when the team was purchased by the French Renault car company.  The team competed as Renault F1 until 2011, when it was again rebranded this time under the "Lotus Renault GP" name after forging a partnership with the British Lotus Cars company.  The subsequent year the team became Lotus F1 after they dropped the Renault name.  The team was later re-purchased by Renault in late 2015 to become the Renault Sport F1 Team for 2016.

Politics
Witney was, until recently, a safe seat for the Conservative Party. Former Foreign Secretary Douglas Hurd and former leader of the Conservatives and Prime Minister David Cameron were both MPs for Witney. In the 1997 General Election, Shaun Woodward stood and won the seat as a Conservative, after Hurd retired. Woodward switched to the Labour Party in 1999.  In the 2001 General Election Woodward stood as the Labour candidate in the St Helens South constituency, and David Cameron retook Witney for the Conservatives. He became Prime Minister in coalition with the Liberal Democrats in May 2010 and continued after the 2015 election, in which the Conservative Party gained a majority, but retired to the backbenches after the referendum that rejected his government's recommendation to remain in the European Union. He stood down as an MP soon afterwards, triggering a by-election held on 20 October 2016, in which Robert Courts was elected for the Conservatives. Courts was re-elected in 2017.  

For elections to Oxfordshire County Council Witney is covered by the electoral wards of 'Witney North and East' and 'Witney South and Central'. The west of the town is included in the ward of 'Witney West and Bampton' which includes villages of Bampton and Ducklington. The wards were created in 2013, with the new Witney South and Central won by the Labour Party and the other two wards won by the Conservatives. At the 2021 Oxfordshire County Council election Labour held Witney South and Central and gained Witney North and East from the Conservatives.

For elections to West Oxfordshire District Council Witney is divided into the wards of Witney Central, Witney East, Witney North, Witney South and Witney West electing a total of 12 district councillors.  As of 2022 the majority of the town of Witney's councillors on the council represented the Labour Party and the mayor was Labour's Liz Duncan.

Twinning

Witney is twinned with:
 Unterhaching, Germany
 Le Touquet, France

Floods

In July 2007 Witney saw its worst flooding in more than 50 years. Homes and businesses were evacuated and Bridge Street, a major road into the town and the only road across the Windrush, was closed. About 200 properties in central Witney were flooded, with areas around Bridge Street, Mill Street and West End the worst affected. The new and incomplete housing development Aquarius also suffered substantial flooding.  In 2008 further flooding contributed to the death of a 17-year-old boy who drowned in a culvert.

Climate
Witney has a maritime climate type typical to the British Isles, with evenly spread rainfall, a narrow temperature range, and comparatively low sunshine totals. The absolute maximum recorded was 35.4c(95.7f) in August 1990, although in a typical year the warmest day should only reach 29.5c(85.1f) with an average of 14.6 days reporting a maximum temperature of 25.1c(77.2f) or above. The absolute minimum is −20.7c(−5.3f), recorded in January 1982. In a more typical year the annual minimum temperature should be −8.1c(17.4f), although a total of 47.1 nights should report an air frost. Rainfall averages slightly under 644mm per year with more than 1mm of rain falling on just under 115 days of the year.

Media
In May 2010, WitneyTV  was launched as a non-profit online broadcaster with a weekly show that features local news and upcoming events within West Oxfordshire for the benefit of the community. An archive of videos featuring local attractions, clubs, organisations and previous shows is also available.  On 30 November 2012 Witney Radio was launched. Providing hyper-local news, music and current affairs to the people of Witney and West Oxfordshire. A licence to broadcast on FM radio was granted in April 2016 by the licensing authority OFCOM. On 14 July 2017 Witney Radio began to broadcast on 99.9fm to Witney and West Oxfordshire. The station broadcasts 24 hours a day, 7 days a week with over 30 presenters from the local area. The station also broadcasts online for listeners online via TuneIn.

Notable people
Notable people associated with Witney include:
David Cameron, former MP for Witney in Parliament, and former Prime Minister of the United Kingdom and Conservative Leader
Jamie Cook (footballer)
Alan Dapre, children's TV show writer
Lawson D'Ath, footballer, Yeovil Town F.C. lived in Witney and attended Henry Box School
Jorge Grant, footballer, Lincoln City, attended Wood Green School.
Darrell Griffin, England  rugby league footballer
Douglas Hurd, former Conservative MP for Witney
Charlie Hutchison, British communist, only black British volunteer to join the International Brigades, and liberator of Belsen concentration camp, born in Witney.
Martin Jones, concert pianist
Simon King, Former Gillingham and Oxford United footballer, grew up in Witney and attended Henry Box School.
Daniel Leach, Select Group 2 Assistant Referee
Graham Leonard, 130th Bishop of London, subsequently Prelate of Honour
Rhys Lewis, singer-songwriter signed with Decca Records, 2017–present.
Robert Llewellyn, Red Dwarf actor and author, attended Henry Box School and was expelled
Andrew Logan, artist, born in Witney
Gugu Mbatha-Raw, TV and film actress, grew up in the town and attended Henry Box School
Maddie Moate, television presenter and YouTuber, attended Henry Box School and grew up in nearly Curbridge
David Moss, footballer, Luton Town, previously Swindon Town and Witney Town
Robbie Mustoe, footballer, notably with Middlesbrough
Lorraine Pascal, model and TV chef, lived in Witney as a child
Miss Read (Dora Saint), author, lived in Witney. The town was the inspiration for the fictional "Lulling" of the Thrush Green novels.
Larry Sanders, Green party councillor and brother of US presidential candidate Bernie Sanders
William Smith, cricketer
James Allen Shuffrey, notable watercolour artist, was born in Wood Green, Witney in 1858.
Leonard Shuffrey, leading architect and architectural designer, was born in Wood Green, Witney, in 1852.
Patrick Steptoe, pioneer of fertility treatment, attended Henry Box School
Shaun Woodward, Conservative and then Labour MP for Witney, then Labour MP for St Helens South from 2001 to 2015.

See also
West Oxfordshire District

References

Sources and further reading

External links

British History Online Witney entry
Official Witney Town Council website
Witney website – Witney website
This is Witney website

Witney Blanket Story
Witney TV
Witney Radio
Witney & District Football
Witney United Football Club
Witney Rugby Football Club
The Book Of Witney – by Charles and Joan Gott
Witney & District Historical and Archaeological Society – Talks, articles and photo galleries relating to Witney and local area.
Archival material relating to Witney listed at the UK National Archives

 
Civil parishes in Oxfordshire
Market towns in Oxfordshire
West Oxfordshire District